Queensbridge was a ward in the London Borough of Hackney, forming part of the Hackney South and Shoreditch constituency.

The ward, renamed London Fields as of the 2014 local elections, returns three councillors to Borough Council, with an election every four years. At the election on 6 May 2010, Emma Plouviez, Tom Price, and Patrick Vernon, all Labour Party candidates, were returned. Turnout was 58%, with 5,360 votes cast.

In 2001, Queensbridge ward had a total population of 10,165, near the average ward population within the borough of 10,674. The population at the 2011 Census was 13,670.

The ward is part of the neighbourhood of Shoreditch, and includes London Fields and Broadway Market.

References

External links
 London Borough of Hackney list of constituencies and councillors.
 Labour Party profile of Emma Plouviez
 Labour Party profile of Tom Price
 Labour Party profile of Patrick Vernon
2005 by-election results

Wards of the London Borough of Hackney
2014 disestablishments in England
1965 establishments in England